"Count on Me" is a song by British record production duo Chase & Status, featuring vocals from British singer Moko (also known as Nadiah Adu-Gyamfi). It was released as the second single from their third studio album Brand New Machine on 29 September 2013. The single peaked at number five on the UK Singles Chart, tying with "Blind Faith" as their highest-charting single to date.

Background and release
A shortened edit of "Count on Me" premiered on UKF Music's YouTube channel on 27 July 2013, at a total length of two minutes and thirty-one seconds. The full version premiered with the official music video on 22 September. The Nathan C remix which appears on the extended play was originally a bootleg but was heard by the duo and they decided to officially release it. The Andy C remix also features on the deluxe edition of Brand New Machine. "Count On Me" was performed on Top of the Pops for Christmas 2013 as one of the highlights of the year.

Music video
The official video was first only available to watch through Twitter, using a custom JavaScript code to play the Vevo video on the site and appear on users' Twitter profiles with deliberate coded glitches. The video was later made public through YouTube, at a total length of three minutes and fifty seconds.

Critical reception
Robert Copsey of Digital Spy gave the song a positive review stating:

Londoners Chase & Status may have swung somewhat dramatically to the other end of the drum 'n' bass spectrum for their third album Brand New Machine, but we wouldn't blame a casual music listener if they didn't even bat an eyelid upon hearing the duo's latest single 'Count On Me'.

Because while gone are the heavy dubstep lines and wobbly breakdowns, they've far from lost their knack for a giant chorus, which is demonstrated no better than on their current offering. Aided by a rich and growly vocal supplied by rising soul singer Moko, her looped vocal on the chorus sounds like something straight out of the early '90s techno scene. That said, it's C&S's slick and strobing production that hauls it firmly back to the present day. .

Track listing

Personnel
 Will "Status" Kennard – production, mixing
 Saul "Chase" Milton – production, mixing, keyboards, drum programming
 Nadiah Adu-Gyamfi (aka Moko) – vocals
 Yolanda Quartey – additional vocals
 Henry "Hal" Ritson – keyboards, vocal production, additional bass
 Zane Lowe – writer
 Rob MacFarlane – engineer
 Cameron Saunders – sample clearance, special thanks
 Rick Lloyd – sample clearance, special thanks

Chart performance

Weekly charts

Year-end charts

Certifications

Release history

References 

2013 singles
2013 songs
Big beat songs
Breakbeat hardcore songs
Chase & Status songs
Mercury Records singles
MTA Records singles
RAM Records singles
Songs written by Will Kennard
Songs written by Saul Milton